Sexual abuse or sex abuse, also referred to as molestation, is abusive sexual behavior by one person upon another. It is often perpetrated using force or by taking advantage of another. Molestation often refers to an instance of sexual assault against a small child, whereas sexual abuse is a term used for a persistent pattern of sexual assaults. 

The offender is referred to as a sexual abuser or (often pejoratively) molester. The term also covers behavior by an adult or older adolescent towards a child to stimulate any of the involved sexually. The use of a child, or other individuals younger than the age of consent, for sexual stimulation is referred to as child sexual abuse or statutory rape. Live streaming sexual abuse involves trafficking and coerced sexual acts and or rape in real time on webcam.

Victims

Spouses

Spousal sexual abuse is a form of domestic violence. When the abuse involves threats of unwanted sexual contact or forced sex by a woman's husband or ex-husband, it may constitute rape, depending on the jurisdiction, and may also constitute an assault.

Children

Child sexual abuse is a form of child abuse in which a child is abused for the sexual gratification of an adult or older adolescent. It includes direct sexual contact, the adult or otherwise older person engaging indecent exposure (of the genitals, female nipples, etc.) to a child with intent to gratify their own sexual desires or to intimidate or groom the child, asking or pressuring a child to engage in sexual activities, displaying pornography to a child, or using a child to produce child pornography.

Effects of child sexual abuse include shame, self-blame, depression, anxiety, post-traumatic stress disorder, self-esteem issues, sexual dysfunction, chronic pelvic pain, addiction, self-injury, suicidal ideation, borderline personality disorder, and propensity to re-victimization in adulthood. Child sexual abuse is a risk factor for attempting suicide. Additionally, some studies have shown childhood sexual abuse to be a risk factor of the perpetration of intimate partner violence in men. Much of the harm caused to victims becomes apparent years after the abuse happens. With specific regard to addiction, a study by Reiger et al. supports previous findings that adverse life events increase sensitivity to drug rewards and bolster drug reward signaling by exposing an association between heightened limbic response to cocaine cues.

Sexual abuse by a family member is a form of incest, which can result in severe long-term psychological trauma, especially in the case of parental incest. 

Globally, approximately 18–19% of women and 8% of men disclose being sexually abused during their childhood. The gender gap may be caused by higher victimization of girls, lower willingness of men to disclose abuse, or both. Most sexual abuse offenders are acquainted with their victims; approximately 30%  are relatives of the child, most often fathers, uncles or cousins; around 60% are other acquaintances such as friends of the family, babysitters, or neighbors; strangers are the offenders in approximately 10% of child sexual abuse cases. Most child sexual abuse is committed by men; women commit approximately 14% of offenses reported against boys and 6% of offenses reported against girls. Child sexual abuse offenders are not pedophiles unless they have a primary or exclusive sexual interest in prepubescent children.

People with developmental disabilities

People with developmental disabilities are often victims of sexual abuse. According to research, people with disabilities are at a greater risk for victimization of sexual assault or sexual abuse because of lack of understanding (Sobsey & Varnhagen, 1989).

Elderly and people with dementia
Elderly people, especially those with dementia, can be at risk of abuse.  There were over 6,000 "safeguarding concerns and alerts" at UK care homes from 2013 to 2015. These included alleged inappropriate touching and worse allegations. Offenders were most often other residents but staff also offended. It is suspected some care homes may deliberately overlook these offenses.

People in poverty
People in poverty, including those from developing countries, are vulnerable to forced prostitution, live streaming sexual abuse, and other forms of molestation. Victims who come from families in poverty often have less connections, power, protection, and education about sex crimes.

Minorities 

Sexual abuse is a problem in some minority communities. In 2007, a number of Hispanic victims were included in the settlement of a massive sexual abuse case involving the Los Angeles archdiocese of the Catholic Church. A qualitative study by Kim et al. discusses the experiences of sexual abuse in the US population of Mexican immigrant women, citing immigration, acculturation, and several other social elements as risk factors for abuse.

Animals 
Captive breeding activities are sometimes described as sexual abuse. People for the Ethical Treatment of Animals (PETA) has specifically objected, for example, to SeaWorld's breeding of orcas (Orcinus orca). Captive breeding of animals led to the idea of capturing and enslaving women for involuntary breeding according to Charles Patterson.

Treatment
In the emergency department, contraceptive medications are offered to women raped by men because about 5% of such rapes result in pregnancy. Preventative medication against sexually transmitted infections are given to victims of all types of sexual abuse (especially for the most common diseases like chlamydia, gonorrhea, trichomoniasis and bacterial vaginosis) and a blood serum is collected to test for STIs (such as HIV, hepatitis B and syphilis). Any survivor with abrasions are immunized for tetanus if 5 years have elapsed since the last immunization. Short-term treatment with a benzodiazepine may help with acute anxiety and antidepressants may be helpful for symptoms of PTSD, depression and panic attacks.

Sexual abuse has been linked to the development of psychotic symptoms in abused children. Treatment for psychotic symptoms may also be involved in sexual abuse treatment.

In regards to long term psychological treatment, prolonged exposure therapy has been tested as a method of long-term PTSD treatment for victims of sexual abuse.

Prevention
Child sexual abuse prevention programmes were developed in the United States of America during the 1970s and originally delivered to children. Programmes delivered to parents were developed in the 1980s and took the form of one-off meetings, two to three hours long. In the last 15 years, web-based programmes have been developed.

Survivor 
The term survivor is sometimes used for a living victim, including victims of non-fatal harm, to honor and empower the strength of an individual to heal, in particular a living victim of sexual abuse or assault. For example, there are the Survivors Network of those Abused by Priests and The Survivors Trust.

Positions of power

Sexual misconduct can occur where one person uses a position of authority to compel another person to engage in an otherwise unwanted sexual activity. For example, sexual harassment in the workplace might involve an employee being coerced into a sexual situation out of fear of being dismissed. Sexual harassment in education might involve a student submitting to the sexual advances of a person in authority in fear of being punished, for example by being given a failing grade.

Several sexual abuse scandals have involved abuse of religious authority and often cover-up among non-abusers, including cases in the Southern Baptist Convention, Catholic Church, Episcopalian religion, Islam, Jehovah's Witnesses, Lutheran church, Methodist Church, Anabaptist/Mennonite Church, The Church of Jesus Christ of Latter-day Saints, the Fundamentalist Church of Jesus Christ of Latter Day Saints, Orthodox Judaism, other branches of Judaism, various buddhist schools such as Zen and Tibetan, Yoga classes, and various cults.

In October 2020, a powerful member of the United Arab Emirates' royal family, Nahyan bin Mubarak Al Nahyan, was accused of exploiting his authority by a British citizen, Caitlin McNamara, who was working on Abu Dhabi Hay Festival. On February 14 that year, the UAE's Minister of Tolerance called McNamara for a dinner at his villa on private island and sexually abused the woman, who was organizing the literary festival for the country.

Social media 
Due to social media censorship algorithms, people wishing to discuss sex and particular sexual assault have adopted the 'algospeak' code word 'mascara' to refer to a boyfriend or romantic partner in a sexual context and then proceed to euphemistically describe bad experiences. The use of such code language can also lead to confusion and embarrassment for those who are unfamiliar with the intended meaning.

Animals

Sexual abuse has been identified among animals as well, for example, among the Adélie penguins.

See also

References

Further reading

External links 

 
 

 
Sex crimes
Sexual ethics
Abuse